Lee Keun-ho (born February 27, 1993) is a South Korean football player.

Playing career
Lee Keun-ho joined to J1 League club; Omiya Ardija in 2013. He moved to J2 League club; Giravanz Kitakyushu in 2014 season and J3 League club; Blaublitz Akita in 2015 season.

Club statistics

References

External links

1993 births
Living people
South Korean footballers
J1 League players
J2 League players
J3 League players
Omiya Ardija players
Giravanz Kitakyushu players
Blaublitz Akita players
Association football midfielders
Pocheon Citizen FC players
Footballers from Seoul